Merton Abbey may refer to:

Merton Priory, a former Augustinian priory in what is now southwest London, England
Merton Abbey, London, the residential area in southwest London on the site of the former priory
Merton Abbey Mills, a former textile factory in the parish of Merton near the site of the medieval Merton Priory
Merton Abbey railway station, a former railway station in London which closed in 1929.